Is There Life After Youth? is a Canadian talk show television miniseries which aired on CBC Television in 1974.

Premise
American psychologist Daniel Levinson hosted this four-part series on middle age and its phases. It was recorded on location at a resort in Quebec with a panel of 12 people aged from 38 to 50 who discussed their life decisions.

Scheduling
This half-hour series was broadcast on Mondays at 10:00 p.m. (Eastern) from 14 October to 4 November 1974.

References

External links
 

CBC Television original programming
1974 Canadian television series debuts
1974 Canadian television series endings